Brian MacPhie (born May 11, 1972 in San Jose) is a former professional tennis player from the United States. 

MacPhie enjoyed most of his tennis success while playing doubles. During his career, he won seven doubles titles. He achieved a career-high doubles ranking of world No. 22 in 2002.

MacPhie is now coaching tennis to juniors and adults in Austin, Texas at the Hills of Lakeway Elevation Athletic Club.

Performance timelines

Singles

Doubles

Mixed doubles

ATP career finals

Doubles: 20 (7 titles, 13 runner-ups)

ATP Challenger and ITF Futures finals

Singles: 3 (0–3)

Doubles: 14 (11–3)

External links
 
 

American male tennis players
Sportspeople from San Jose, California
USC Trojans men's tennis players
Tennis people from California
Living people
1972 births